Hyles nicaea, the Mediterranean hawk-moth, is a moth of the family Sphingidae. The species was first described by Leonardo de Prunner in 1798.

Distribution 
The nominate subspecies is found from southern Portugal and Spain though southern Europe to Turkey. It is also found on the Balearic Islands and in south-western Bulgaria.

Description 
The wingspan is 80–100 mm.

Biology 
Adults are on wing in June in one generation. At times there is a partial second generation in August. Subspecies H. n. castissima is on wing from May to June and from July to August in two generations. Subspecies H. n. orientalis is on wing from June to July in one generation. Subspecies H. n. sheljuzkoi is on wing in May and July/August in two to three generations.

The larvae feed on Euphorbia species, including Euphorbia nicaeensis. Subspecies H. n. orientalis feeds on Euphorbia petrophila and Euphorbia seguieriana and H. n. sheljuzkoi has been recorded on Euphorbia oxydonta in Jordan.

Subspecies
Hyles nicaea nicaea
Hyles nicaea lathyrus (eastern Afghanistan, north-western India and Xizang)
Hyles nicaea castissima (Atlas mountains of North Africa)
Hyles nicaea sheljuzkoi (Lebanon and northern Israel to western Xinjiang in China)
Hyles nicaea orientalis (southern Crimea and western Transcaucasia)

Gallery

References

External links

Moths and Butterflies of Europe and North Africa

Lepiforum e.V.

Hyles (moth)
Moths described in 1798
Moths of Europe
Moths of Asia